The John Fitzgerald Kennedy Memorial, also known as The Grotto: John Fitzgerald Kennedy Memorial, is an outdoor 1965 large bas-relief sculpture and memorial to John F. Kennedy by an unknown artist, installed outside The Grotto in Portland, Oregon, United States.

Description and reception

The large bas-relief sculpture and memorial to John F. Kennedy is installed in the parking lot of The Grotto, a Catholic shrine and sanctuary formally known as the National Sanctuary of Our Sorrowful Mother, located at Northeast Sandy Boulevard and 85th Avenue in Portland's Madison South neighborhood. It was created in 1965 by an unknown artist. The plaque displays Kennedy's profile, the same seen on the Kennedy half dollar.

The memorial was gifted by multiple Catholic organizations. Its condition was deemed "well maintained" by the Smithsonian Institution's "Save Outdoor Sculpture!" program in July 1993. The memorial is administered by the National Sanctuary of Our Sorrowful Mother and has been included in published walking tours of Portland.

See also

 1965 in art
 Cultural depictions of John F. Kennedy
 List of memorials to John F. Kennedy

References

External links
 
 JFK at the Grotto - Portland, OR at Waymarking

1965 establishments in Oregon
1965 sculptures
Monuments and memorials to John F. Kennedy in the United States
Madison South, Portland, Oregon
Monuments and memorials in Portland, Oregon
Outdoor sculptures in Portland, Oregon
Sculptures of men in Oregon
Sculptures of presidents of the United States